Marshall's Hotel, subsequently known as the Firehole Hotel was the first public accommodations built in the Firehole River geyser basins of Yellowstone National Park and among the earliest tourist hotels in Yellowstone.  The first hotel was built in 1880 by George W. Marshall (1838-1917) and his partner John B. Goff and was located just west of confluence of the Firehole River and Nez Perce Creek. A second hotel, the Firehole Hotel, was built in 1884 in partnership with George Graham Henderson very near the present day Nez Perce Picnic area. The hotels operated for eleven years under various ownership ceasing operation in 1891.  By 1895, all the structures except a few cabins associated with the two hotels had been razed.

1880-1884

George Marshall had a U.S. government mail contract to carry mail from Virginia City, Montana to Mammoth Hot Springs in 1879. It was cancelled at the end of that year.  The route from Virginia City to Mammoth took Marshall over the Madison Plateau on the Old Fountain Pack Trail (abandoned today).  This trail passed right by the confluence of the Firehole River and Nez Perce Creek on its way to Mammoth.  Upon losing his mail contract, Marshall chose to build a cabin on the Firehole River with the aim of servicing visitors to the park.

In the 1881 season, there were six rooms in the hotel, a lounge, a dining room, a kitchen and quarters for the Marshalls.  There were two guest rooms.  An 1881 visitor described the hotel thus:

1885
In May 1885, Marshall (age 39) and his wife Sarah decided to sell out. With four children having spent four seasons, including four winters in Yellowstone, he sold his interest in the hotel to his partner George Graham Henderson.  Henderson had partnered with Henry Klamer, the son-in-law of George L. Henderson (no relation) the owner of the Cottage Hotel at Mammoth Hot Springs. Klamer would later be the owner of the Old Faithful store that is now known as the Lower Hamilton Store.  Once Henderson and Klamer owned the property, they renamed it The Firehole Hotel.

1886-1891
In 1886, through a series of ownership transfers, the hotel became the property of the Yellowstone Park Association, owned by Charles Gibson.  The Association was becoming the preeminent concessionaire in the park at the time.  They were building the Mammoth Hotel (completed in 1886), operated tent hotels at Norris and Canyon, and eventually completed the first Canyon Hotel in 1890.  Park visitation was increasing every year and these hotels—Mammoth and Canyon were setting a new standard; one that Marshall's could not meet. In 1886, the U.S. Army took charge of Yellowstone, and then military superintendent Captain Moses Harris began a campaign to rid the park of this particular hotel. In official reports he wrote:

Unfavorable accounts from visitors such as this one did not help the hotel:

Army administration of the park had allowed significant improvement of the park's road system and travel time between attractions were significantly shorter than a decade previous. The Yellowstone Park Association constructed the significantly larger and more luxurious Fountain Hotel very near Fountain Paint Pots in 1890 and opened it in the spring of 1891. By June 1891, all the old Marshall or Firehole Hotel properties had been vacated and operations transferred to the Fountain Hotel. The Fountain Hotel operated until 1916. Most of the older Marshall buildings were burned in 1891, but a few survived until 1895 when the Firehole Hotel itself was razed.

Notable visitors and events

 In September 1885, the son of General Oliver O. Howard of the Nez Perce War of 1877, 19-year-old John Howard was visiting the park with his brother James, General Howard, his wife and John's fiancee, a Miss Chase.  During their stay at Marshall's, James and John got in a very heated argument over Miss Chase. After another argument with Miss Chase herself, John Howard attempted suicide by shooting himself in the chest.  He survived and convalesced in the hotel, but the incident made two separate editions of the Livingston Enterprise.
 Known to have stayed at the hotel in 1881 were Wyoming Territorial Governor John W. Hoyt and then Senator Benjamin Harrison (later the 23rd President of the United States).
 Sarah and George Marshall's fourth child Rosa Park Marshall was born at the hotel on January 31, 1881.  Rosa Marshall is purportedly the first white child born in the park.  Northern Pacific Railway surveyors working is North Dakota in 1882 named Rosa Lake , a small lake near Cavalier, ND in her honor.
 During the 1884 season, noted naturalist, George Bird Grinnell visited Marshall's and later wrote the following in Forest and Stream about the site as he approached from the west:

 In 1886, Charles Warren Stoddard

Mattie Culver grave
One of the few marked graves in Yellowstone outside of the Mammoth Hot Springs area is that of Mattie S. Culver, age 30, who died of tuberculosis at the hotel on March 2, 1889.  Mrs. Culver was the wife of the hotel's winter keeper, E. C. Culver.  Because of frozen ground at the time, Culver's body was stored in two end-to-end barrels outside the hotel until spring. Adelaide Child, the wife of the Yellowstone Park Improvement Company president Harry W. Child,
ensured a proper burial, memorial and fenced in tombstone near the hotel.

Gallery

See also
 Old Faithful Inn
 Lake Hotel

Notes

Hotel buildings completed in 1880
Hotels established in 1880
Buildings and structures in Yellowstone National Park in Wyoming
Hotels in Wyoming
1880 establishments in Wyoming Territory
Demolished buildings and structures in Wyoming
Buildings and structures demolished in 1890